Somerset is a coastal locality split between the Shire of Torres and the Northern Peninsula Area Region, Queensland, Australia.

Geography
Somerset is the northernmost locality on the Cape York Peninsula and also of the Queensland mainland with Cape York at the northernmost point.

History
Several Indigenous groups occupied this region prior to European contact. In an 1896 report to the Queensland Government, Archibald Meston estimated that in the 1870s the Indigenous population between Newcastle Bay and Cape York was around 3000. At the time of writing his report, he believed that the population had fallen to around 300. This rapid decline was caused by a number of factors, including introduced disease, exclusions from traditional hunting grounds and frontier violence. Reverend Frederick Charles Jagg, a missionary at Somerset appointed by the Society for the Propagation of the Gospel, gave an indication of the relationship between European and Indigenous peoples when he reported in 1867 that "The aborigines have been described as the most degraded, treacherous and bloodthirsty beings in existence by the present Police Magistrate, and those whose only idea is to shoot them down whenever they were seen".

Gudang (Gootung) is one of the languages of the tip of Cape York. The Gudang language region includes the landscape within the local government boundaries of the Northern Peninsula Area Regional Council, particularly the localities of Somerset, Albany Passage and Newcastle Bay extending north to the Tip.

The colony's first parliament passed a resolution in 1860 favouring direct connection with England via the Torres Strait. In December 1861, Sir George Ferguson Bowen (1821–99), Governor of Queensland (1859–67), described the necessity for a station in the far north of Queensland. From a naval and military point of view, a post at or near Cape York would be valuable, due to the establishment of a French colony and naval station in New Caledonia. Bowen informed Henry Pelham-Clinton, 5th Duke of Newcastle, Secretary of State for the Colonies, that the government of Queensland would be willing to undertake the formation and management of a station at Cape York and to support a civil establishment there.

On 27 August 1862, Bowen left Brisbane on HMS Pioneer to select an eligible site for the proposed settlement. The chosen site, opposite Albany Island, was named Somerset, in honour of the First Lord of the Admiralty, Edward Seymour, 12th Duke of Somerset.

Tenders were called for the construction of government buildings in March 1863, a town survey was undertaken in July 1864 and the Town Reserve of Somerset was established on 8 July 1864. The first Somerset land sale was held in Brisbane on 4 April 1865 and a second sale took place on 2 May 1866. Land parcels sold at these auctions were about one acre (0.405 a) in size.

In February 1864, John Jardine (1807–74) was appointed Somerset's first Police Magistrate and Commissioner of Crown Lands and in July 1864 he was appointed District Registrar for the District of North Cook. An early sketch of Somerset by Jardine shows the Government Residence, Police Magistrate's House and Customs House on the southern side of Somerset Bay, and Marines' Barracks and the Medical Superintendent's House on the northern side. Henry Simpson succeeded Jardine as Police Magistrate in 1866. The Marines were withdrawn in 1867 and replaced with Native Police.

John Jardine was the father of Francis (Frank) Lascelles Jardine (1841-1919) and Alexander (Alick) William Jardine (1843-1920) who, between May 1864 and March 1865, undertook an overland expedition from Rockhampton to Cape York which was described at the time as, geographically:"solving the question of the course of the northern rivers emptying into the Gulf of Carpentaria of which nothing was known but their outlets. It has also made known...how much ... or rather, how little, of the 'York Peninsula' is adapted for pastoral occupation, whilst its success in taking the first stock overland, and forming a cattle station at Newcastle Bay, has ensured to the Settlement at Somerset a necessary and welcome supply of fresh meat...".The Jardine River was named after them by order of Governor Bowen. For their pioneering exploratory efforts the Jardine brothers were made Fellows of the Royal Geographical Society and awarded the Society's Murchison Award in 1886.
Frank Jardine was appointed as a Magistrate in December 1867 and as Police Magistrate and Inspector of Police at Somerset in April 1868. In 1869 he held the positions of District Registrar for Somerset, Police Magistrate, Clerk of Petty Sessions, Inspector of Police and Postmaster. He married Samoan woman, Sana Sofala, in 1873 and the couple had four children: Alice Maule Lascelles, Hew Cholmondeley (Chum), Bootle Arthur Lascelles (Bertie) and Elizabeth Sana Hamilton. Frank Jardine's tenure as a government officer in Somerset was not without controversy. The local Indigenous population was dispossessed and there was hostility between them and the Jardine family, both during Frank and Alick Jardine's expedition to Somerset, and during the years of the settlement. Jardine was also suspended for a time from his duties as Police Magistrate whilst being investigated in relation to using his position to obtain a pearl diving licence.

Somerset became redundant as a port once a safer shipping route to the Torres Strait was found and a settlement on Thursday Island was built from 1876. Frank Jardine continued to live at Somerset, maintaining the police residence until his death there in March 1919. During this time, Jardine continued to maintain a beef cattle herd; was engaged in the pearling industry; and created a coconut/copra plantation at Somerset. Due to Somerset's isolated location the Jardine family provided assistance and hospitality to travellers and seafarers, for example, Jardine aided the survivors of the shipwreck of RMS Quetta in 1890.

The pearl diving industry was important to the Queensland economy, and came to be dominated by Japanese divers after 1891. Kobori Itchimatsu came from the village of Nishi Mukai in Wakayama prefecture, an area that provided 80 per cent of the 7,000 Japanese who left their country to become pearl divers.

The Kennedy Memorial Monument was unveiled on 13 December 1948 in commemoration of the 100th anniversary of Edmund Besley Court Kennedy's unsuccessful exploration of Cape York Peninsula. The monument comprises a concrete slab on a concrete footing with a bronze commemorative plaque on its eastern face.

The determination was handed down on 30 October 2014.

In the 2011 census, Somerset had a population of 0 people.

Attractions 
There is an historical ruin of Somerset homestead, a station established by John Jardine (father of Frank Jardine) in 1863 and is 35 km north of Bamaga on Cape York in Queensland, Australia. It is a good camping area and day trip with facilities for barbecues. It is situated near a beach.

Heritage listings 
 Somerset Graves Site

References

Sources 

 Somerset. Pictures, photos, objects
 Narrative of the overland expedition of the Messrs. Jardine, from Rockhampton to Cape York, Northern Queensland. Frank and Alexander Jardine Compiled from the journals of the brothers, and edited by Frederick J. Byerley, (Engineer of Roads, Northern Division of Queensland). — Brisbane: J. W. Buxton, 1867. — p. 88
 Austin C. G., Early history of Somerset and Thursday Island, Journal of the Royal Historical Society of Queensland, vol. 4, № 2, 1949, p. 216-230, ISSN 1837-8366
 Bayton J., The mission to the Aborigines at Somerset, Journal of the Royal Historical Society of Queensland, vol. 7, № 3, 1965, p. 622-633, ISSN 0085-5804
 Carroll J. M., Journey into Torres Straits, Queensland Heritage, vol. 2, № 1, 1969, p. 35-42, ISSN 0033-6157
 Moore, C. R., Queensland's annexation of New Guinea in 1883, Journal of the Royal Historical Society of Queensland, vol. 12, № 1, 1984, p. 26-54, ISSN 0085-5804
 Australian Dictionary of Biography: Jardine, John (1807-1874)
 Australian Dictionary of Biography: Jardine, Francis Lascelles (Frank) (1841–1919)
  Australian Dictionary of Biography: Chester, Henry Marjoribanks (1832–1914)
 Australian Dictionary of Biography: Dalrymple, George Augustus (1826–1876)

Shire of Torres
Northern Peninsula Area Region
Coastline of Queensland
Localities in Queensland